The following is a list of the dragonflies and damselflies found in Kerala, a state on the southwestern, Malabar Coast of India.

Suborder: Zygoptera (Damselflies)

Family: Lestidae (Spread-winged damselflies)

Genus: Indolestes

Species: Indolestes gracilis davenporti

Species: Indolestes pulcherrimus

Genus: Lestes

Species: Lestes concinnus

Species: Lestes dorothea

Species: Lestes elatus

Species: Lestes malabaricus

Species: Lestes nodalis

Species: Lestes patricia

Species: Lestes praemorsus

Genus: Platylestes

Species: Platylestes kirani

Species: Platylestes platystylus

Family: Platystictidae (Shadow damselflies)

Genus: Indosticta

Species: Indosticta deccanensis

Genus: Protosticta

Species: Protosticta antelopoides

Species: Protosticta cyanofemora

Species: Protosticta davenporti

Species: Protosticta gravelyi

Species: Protosticta hearseyi

Species: Protosticta monticola

Species: Protosticta mortoni

Species: Protosticta ponmudiensis

Species: Protosticta rufostigma

Species: Protosticta sanguinostigma

Species: Protosticta sholai

Family: Calopterygidae (Broad-winged damselflies)

Genus: Neurobasis

Species: Neurobasis chinensis

Genus: Vestalis

Species: Vestalis apicalis

Species: Vestalis gracilis

Species: Vestalis submontana

Family: Chlorocyphidae (Stream Jewels)

Genus: Calocypha

Species: Calocypha laidlawi

Genus: Heliocypha

Species: Heliocypha bisignata

Genus: Libellago

Species: Libellago indica

Family: Euphaeidae (Gossamerwinged damselflies)

Genus: Dysphaea

Species: Dysphaea ethela

Genus: Euphaea

Species: Euphaea cardinalis

Species: Euphaea dispar

Species: Euphaea fraseri

Species: Euphaea pseudodispar

Family: Platycnemididae (White-legged damselflies)

Genus: Caconeura

Species: Caconeura gomphoides

Species: Caconeura ramburi

Species: Caconeura risi

Genus: Copera

Species: Copera marginipes

Species: Copera vittata

Genus: Disparoneura

Species: Disparoneura apicalis

Species: Disparoneura quadrimaculata

Genus: Elattoneura

Species: Elattoneura souteri

Species: Elattoneura tetrica

Genus: Esme

Species: Esme cyaneovittata

Species: Esme longistyla

Species: Esme mudiensis

Genus: Melanoneura

Species: Melanoneura bilineata

Genus: Onychargia

Species: Onychargia atrocyana

Genus: Phylloneura

Species: Phylloneura westermanni

Genus: Prodasineura

Species: Prodasineura verticalis

Family: Coenagrionidae (Narrow-winged damselflies)

Genus: Aciagrion

Species: Aciagrion approximans krishna

Species: Aciagrion occidentale

Genus: Agriocnemis

Species: Agriocnemis keralensis

Species: Agriocnemis pieris

Species: Agriocnemis pygmaea

Species: Agriocnemis splendidissima

Genus: Amphiallagma

Species: Amphiallagma parvum

Genus: Archibasis

Species: Archibasis oscillans

Genus: Ceriagrion

Species: Ceriagrion cerinorubellum

Species: Ceriagrion chromothorax

Species: Ceriagrion coromandelianum

Species: Ceriagrion olivaceum

Species: Ceriagrion rubiae

Genus: Ischnura

Species: Ischnura rubilio

Species: Ischnura senegalensis

Genus: Mortonagrion

Species: Mortonagrion varralli

Genus: Paracercion

Species: Paracercion calamorum

Species: Paracercion melanotum

Genus: Pseudagrion

Species: Pseudagrion australasiae

Species: Pseudagrion decorum

Species: Pseudagrion indicum

Species: Pseudagrion malabaricum

Species: Pseudagrion microcephalum

Species: Pseudagrion rubriceps

Suborder: Anisoptera (Dragonflies)

Family: Aeshnidae (Hawkers or Darners)

Genus: Anaciaeschna

Species: Anaciaeschna jaspidea

Species: Anaciaeschna martini

Genus: Anax

Species: Anax ephippiger

Species: Anax guttatus

Species: Anax immaculifrons

Species: Anax indicus

Species: Anax parthenope

Genus: Gynacantha

Species: Gynacantha dravida

Species: Gynacantha millardi

Family: Gomphidae (Clubtails)

Genus: Acrogomphus

Species: Acrogomphus fraseri

Genus: Asiagomphus

Species: Asiagomphus nilgiricus

Genus: Burmagomphus

Species: Burmagomphus cauvericus

Species: Burmagomphus chaukulensis

Species: Burmagomphus laidlawi

Species: Burmagomphus pyramidalis

Genus: Cyclogomphus

Species: Cyclogomphus flavoannulatus

Species: Cyclogomphus heterostylus

Genus: Davidioides

Species: Davidioides martini

Genus: Gomphidia

Species: Gomphidia kodaguensis

Genus: Heliogomphus

Species: Heliogomphus promelas

Genus: Ictinogomphus

Species: Ictinogomphus rapax

Genus: Lamelligomphus

Species: Lamelligomphus nilgiriensis

Genus: Macrogomphus

Species: Macrogomphus wynaadicus

Genus: Megalogomphus

Species: Megalogomphus hannyngtoni

Species: Megalogomphus superbus

Genus: Melligomphus

Species: Melligomphus acinaces

Genus: Merogomphus

Species: Merogomphus longistigma

Species: Merogomphus tamaracherriensis

Genus: Microgomphus

Species: Microgomphus souteri

Genus: Nychogomphus

Species: Nychogomphus striatus

Genus: Onychogomphus

Species: Onychogomphus malabarensis

Genus: Paragomphus

Species: Paragomphus lineatus

Family: Chlorogomphidae

Genus: Chlorogomphus

Species: Chlorogomphus campioni

Species: Chlorogomphus xanthoptera

Family: Macromiidae (Cruisers)

Genus: Epophthalmia

Species: Epophthalmia frontalis

Species: Epophthalmia vittata

Genus: Macromia

Species: Macromia annaimallaiensis

Species: Macromia bellicosa

Species: Macromia cingulata

Species: Macromia ellisoni

Species: Macromia flavocolorata

Species: Macromia ida

Species: Macromia indica

Species: Macromia irata

Family: Corduliidae (Emeralds or Baskettails)

Genus: Hemicordulia

Species: Hemicordulia asiatica

Family: Libellulidae (Skimmers)

Genus: Acisoma

Species: Acisoma panorpoides

Genus: Aethriamanta

Species: Aethriamanta brevipennis

Genus: Brachydiplax

Species: Brachydiplax chalybea

Species: Brachydiplax sobrina

Genus: Brachythemis

Species: Brachythemis contaminata

Genus: Bradinopyga

Species: Bradinopyga geminata

Species: Bradinopyga konkanensis

Genus: Cratilla

Species: Cratilla lineata

Genus: Crocothemis

Species: Crocothemis servilia

Genus: Diplacodes

Species: Diplacodes lefebvrii

Species: Diplacodes nebulosa

Species: Diplacodes trivialis

Genus: Epithemis

Species: Epithemis mariae

Genus: Hydrobasileus

Species: Hydrobasileus croceus

Genus: Hylaeothemis

Species: Hylaeothemis apicalis

Genus: Indothemis

Species: Indothemis carnatica

Species: Indothemis limbata

Genus: Lathrecista

Species: Lathrecista asiatica

Genus: Lyriothemis

Species: Lyriothemis acigastra

Species: Lyriothemis tricolor

Genus: Macrodiplax

Species: Macrodiplax cora

Genus: Neurothemis

Species: Neurothemis fulvia

Species: Neurothemis intermedia

Species: Neurothemis tullia

Genus: Onychothemis

Species: Onychothemis testacea

Genus: Orthetrum

Species: Orthetrum chrysis

Species: Orthetrum glaucum

Species: Orthetrum luzonicum

Species: Orthetrum pruinosum

Species: Orthetrum sabina

Species: Orthetrum taeniolatum

Species: Orthetrum triangulare

Genus: Palpopleura

Species: Palpopleura sexmaculata

Genus: Pantala

Species: Pantala flavescens

Genus: Potamarcha

Species: Potamarcha congener

Genus: Rhodothemis

Species: Rhodothemis rufa

Genus: Rhyothemis

Species: Rhyothemis triangularis

Species: Rhyothemis variegata

Genus: Sympetrum

Species: Sympetrum fonscolombii

Genus: Tetrathemis

Species: Tetrathemis platyptera

Genus: Tholymis

Species: Tholymis tillarga

Genus: Tramea

Species: Tramea basilaris

Species: Tramea limbata

Genus: Trithemis

Species: Trithemis aurora

Species: Trithemis festiva

Species: Trithemis kirbyi

Species: Trithemis pallidinervis

Genus: Urothemis

Species: Urothemis signata

Genus: Zygonyx

Species: Zygonyx iris

Genus: Zyxomma

Species: Zyxomma petiolatum

Family: Incertae sedis

Genus: Idionyx

Species: Idionyx corona

Species: Idionyx galeatus

Species: Idionyx gomantakensis

Species: Idionyx minimus

Species: Idionyx rhinoceroides

Species: Idionyx saffronatus

Species: Idionyx travancorensis

Genus: Macromidia

Species: Macromidia donaldi

References 
Johan Christian Fabricius (1793) Entomologia Systematica Emendata et Aucta. Secundum, Classes, Ordines, Genera, Species, adjectis synonimis, locis, observationibus, descriptionibus - Classis V. Odonata. Hafniae, :impensis Christ. Gottl. Proft. 
Hermann Burmeister (1832-55) Handbuch der Entomologie. Besondere Entomologie. Zweite Abtheilung. Kaukerfe, Gymnognatha. (Zweite Hälfte; vulgo Neuroptera) G. Reimer; Berlin, Germany. 
Jules Pierre Rambur (1842) Histoire naturelle des insectes. Névroptères. Paris. Roret. (through HathiTrust)   
Edmond de Sélys Longchamps (1854) Monographie des Calopterygines. Mémoires de la Société Royale des Sciences de Liége 9:1-292
Edmond de Sélys Longchamps (1858) Monographie des Gomphines. Mémoires de la Société Royale des Sciences de Liége 11:257-713
Edmond de Sélys Longchamps (1850-1883) Synopsis des Gomphines, Synopsis des Cordulines, Synopsis des Aeschnines. Première partie: Classification. Bulletin de l'Académie royale des Sciences de Belgique. 
William Forsell Kirby (1890) A synonymic catalogue of Neuroptera Odonata, or Dragonflies. With an appendix of fossil species. London. Gurney & Jackson.
René Martin (1906) Collections zoologiques du baron Edm. de Selys Longchamps. Cordulines. Bruxelles. Hayez. 
René Martin (1909) Collections zoologiques du baron Edm. de Selys Longchamps. Aeschnines. Bruxelles. Hayez. 
Friedrich Ris (1909-1919) Libellulinen. Collections zoologiques du baron Edm. de Selys Longchamps. Bruxelles.
Friedrich Ris (1909) Odonata. Süsswasserfauna Deutschlands; Heft 9. Jena, G. Fischer.
Robert John Tillyard (1917) The biology of dragonflies (Odonata or Paraneuroptera). Cambridge. University Press.
Laidlaw, F. F. (1914-1934) Bibliography of Laidlaw, F. F.. Records of the Indian Museum. Zoological Survey of India.
Fraser, F.C. (1919-1933) Bibliography of Fraser, F. C.. Records of the Indian Museum. Zoological Survey of India.
Fraser, F.C. (1917-1934). Indian dragonflies. The Journal of the Bombay Natural History Society. 25: 454-471, 25:  608-627, 26:  141-171, 26: 488-517, 26: 734-744, 26: 919-932, 27: 48-56, 27: 253-269, 27: 492-498, 27: 673-691, 28: 107-122, 28: 481-492, 28: 610-620, 28: 899-910, 29: 36-47, 29: 324-333, 29: 659-680, 29: 982-1006, 30: 106-117, 30: 397-405, 30: 657-663, 30: 846-857, 31: 158-171, 31: 408-426, 31: 733-747, 31: 882-889, 32: 183-196, 32: 311-319, 32: 450-459, 32: 683-691, 33: 47-59, 33: 288-301, 33: 576-597, 33: 834-850, 34: 87-107, 34: 752-753, 34: 965-972, 35: 66-76, 35: 325-341, 35: 645-656, 36: 141-151, 36: 607-617, 37: 553-572.
Fraser, F.C. (1922-1924). Dragonfly collecting in India. The Journal of the Bombay Natural History Society. 28: 889-898, 29: 48-69, 29: 474-481, 29: 741-756
Fraser, F.C. (1924) A Survey of the Odonate (Dragonfly) Fauna of Western India and Descriptions of Thirty New Species. Records of the Indian Museum.
Fraser, F.C. (1931) Additions to the Survey of the Odonate (Dragonfly) Fauna of Western India, with Descriptions of Nine New Species. Records of the Indian Museum.
Fraser, F.C. (1933) The fauna of British India, including Burma and Ceylon, Odonata Vol. I. Taylor and Francis. London. (Zygoptera)
Fraser, F.C. (1934) The fauna of British India, including Burma and Ceylon, Odonata Vol. II. Taylor and Francis. London. (Gomphidae and Calopterygoidea)
Fraser, F.C. (1936) The fauna of British India, including Burma and Ceylon, Odonata Vol. III. Taylor and Francis. London. (Aeshnidae and Libellulidae)
James George Needham (1932) A Key to the Dragonflies of India Records of the Indian Museum. Zoological Survey of India. 34(2):0195-0228. 
Hsiu-fu Chao (1953) The external morphology of dragonfly Onychogomphus ardens Needham. Smithsonian Miscellaneous Collections, 122(6): 1–56.
Lieftinck, M.A. (1960) On the identity of some little known southeast Asiatic Odonata in European museums described by E. de Selys Longchamps with descriptions of new species. Memorie della Societa Entomologica Italiana. 38: 229–256.
Kimmins, D. E. (1966) A list of the Odonata types described by F. C. Fraser, now in the British Museum (Natural History). Bulletin of the British Museum (Natural History). Vol. 18. Pages: 173-227. 
Kimmins, D. E. (1968) A list of the type-specimens of Libellulidae and Corduliidae (Odonata) in the British Museum (Natural History). Bulletin of the British Museum (Natural History). Vol. 22. Pages: 277-305. 
Kimmins, D. E. (1969) A list of the type-specimens of Odonata in the British Museum (Natural History) Part II. Bulletin of the British Museum (Natural History). Vol. 23. Pages: 287-314. 
Kimmins, D. E. (1970) A list of the type-specimens of Odonata in the British Museum (Natural History) Part III. Bulletin of the British Museum (Natural History). Vol. 24. Pages: 171-205.
Philip S. Corbet. 1991. A brief history of Odonatology. Advances in odonatology, vol 5 (1991) nr. 1 p. 21-44
Norman W. Moore. (1997) Dragonflies: Status Survey and Conservation Action Plan. IUCN. SBN: 2-8317-0420-0
Chandran; M. D. Subash. (1997). On the ecological history of the Western Ghats. Current Science. 73 (2): 99-212
Emiliyamma, K.G., Radhakrishnan, C. and Palot, M.J. 2005. Pictorial Handbook on Common Dragonflies and Damselflies of Kerala. p. 1-67. Zoological Survey of India, Kolkata.

Mitra, T.R. 2006. Handbook on - Common Indian Dragonflies (Insecta Odonata) 1-124.
Emiliyamma, K.G., Radhakrishnan, C. and Palot, M.J. 2007. Odonata (Insecta) of Kerala. Records of the Zoological Survey of India, Occasional Paper No. 269, p. 1-195.
Tol J. van, Gassmann D. 2007. Zoogeography of freshwater invertebrates of Southeast Asia, with special reference to Odonata. 45-91: Springer, Dordrecht.
FL Carle, KM Kjer, ML May. 2008. Evolution of Odonata, with special reference to Coenagrionoidea (Zygoptera). Arthropod Systematics & Phylogeny. 66: 37-44.
Mitra, T.R. and Babu, R. 2010. Revision of Indian species of the families Platycnemididae and Coenagrionidae (Insecta : Odonata : Zygoptera)-Taxonomy and Zoogeography. Records of the Zoological Survey of India, Occasional Paper No. 315, p. 1-103.
Subramanian. K.A., Kakkassery, F. and Nair, M.V. 2011. The status and distribution of dragonflies and damselflies (Odonata) of the Western Ghats. In: Status and Distribution of Freshwater Biodiversity in the Western Ghats (Compilers: Molur, S., Smith, K.G., Daniel, B.A. and Darwall, W.R.T.), pp. 63–74. Cambridge, UK and Gland, Switzerland: IUCN, and Coimbatore, India: Zoo Outreach Organization.
Kiran, C. G.; V. Raju, David (2011). "Checklist of Odonata of Kerala with their Malayalamnames". Malabar Trogon. 9 (3): 31–35.
Kiran, C. G.; V. Raju, David (2013). Dragonflies and Damselflies of Kerala (First Edition ed.). Kottayam, Kerala: Tropical Institute of Ecological Sciences (TIES). .
Babu, R., Subramanian, K.A. and Supriya Nandy 2013. Endemic Odonates of India. Records of the Zoological Survey of India, Occasional Paper No. 347: 1-60.
Dijkstra, K-D. B., G. Bechly, S. M. Bybee, R. A. Dow, H. J. Dumont, G. Fleck, R. W. Garrison, M. Hämäläinen, V. J. Kalkman, H. Karube, M. L. May, A. G. Orr, D. R. Paulson, A. C. Rehn, G. Theischinger, J. W. H. Trueman, J. van Tol, N. von Ellenrieder, & J. Ware. 2013. The classification and diversity of dragonflies and damselflies (Odonata). Zootaxa 3703(1): 36-45.
Emiliyamma, K.G. 2014. Systematic studies on Odonata (Insecta) of southern Western Ghats. Records of the Zoological Survey of India, 114(Part-1): 57-87.
Dijkstra, K-D. B., V. J. Kalkman, R. A. Dow, F. R. Stokvis & J. van Tol. 2014. Redefining the damselfly families: a comprehensive molecular phylogeny of Zygoptera (Odonata). Systematic Entomology 39(1): 68-96.
FL Carle, KM Kjer, ML May. 2015. A molecular phylogeny and classification of Anisoptera (Odonata). Arthropod Systematics & Phylogeny. 73: 281-301.
Subramanian, K.A.; Babu, R. (2017). Checklist of Odonata (Insecta) of India. Version 3.0. www.zsi.gov.in

Bybee, S. M., Kalkman, V. J., Erickson, R. J., Frandsen, P. B., Breinholt, J. W., Suvorov, A., Dijkstra, K.-D., Cordero-Rivera, A., Skevington, J.H., Abbott, J.C., Sanchez Herrera, M., Lemmon, A.R., Moriarty Lemmon, E. and Ware,  J.L. 2021. Phylogeny and classification of Odonata using targeted genomics. Molecular Phylogenetics and Evolution: 160: 107115, https://doi.org/10.1016/j.ympev.2021.107115

External links 
John W. H. Trueman; Richard J. Rowe. Tree of Life - Odonata: Dragonflies and damselflies
Odonata of India. National Centre for Biological Sciences (NCBS), Tata Institute of Fundamental Research, India. 
India Biodiversity Portal

Bridges, C. A. 1993. Catalogue of the family-group, genus-group and species-group names of the Odonata of the world (Second Edition). C. A. Bridges, Urbana, Illinois.
Davies, D.A.L., & P. Tobin. 1984. The dragonflies of the world: A systematic list of the extant species of Odonata. Vol. 1. Zygoptera, Anisozygoptera. Societas Internationalis Odonatologica Rapid Comm. (Suppl.) No. 3, Utrecht.
Davies, D.A.L., & P. Tobin. 1985. The dragonflies of the world: a systematic list of extant species of Odonata. Vol. 2. Anisoptera. Soc. Int. Odonatol. Rapid Comm. (Suppl.) No. 5., Utrecht.
Garrison, R. W. 1991. A synonymic list of the New World Odonata. Argia 3(2): 1-30.
Tsuda, S. 1991. A distributional list of World Odonata. Published by author, Osaka.
Steinmann, Henrik. 1997. World Catalogue of Odonata, Vol. I. Zygoptera. – Das Tierreich. The Animal Kingdom, Part 110. – Walter de Gruyter, Berlin-New York.
Steinmann, Henrik. 1997. World Catalogue of Odonota, Vol. II. Anisoptera. – Das Tierreich. The Animal Kingdom, Part 111. – Walter de Gruyter, Berlin-New York.
Matti Hämäläinen. 2016. Calopterygoidea of the World: A synonymic list of extant damselfly species of the superfamily Calopterygoidea (sensu lato) (Odonata: Zygoptera) 

Kerala
Kerala
Dragonflies and damselflies, Kerala
Kerala fauna-related lists